"I'm Not Over You" is a song by American singer-songwriter and former beauty queen CeCe Peniston, originally recorded for her second album, Thought 'Ya Knew (1994), which was released on A&M Records. The single (in the UK available only as B-side of the "Hit by Love" release) achieved number two on the Billboard Dance Club Songs chart, and number ten on the Billboard Hot R&B/Hip-Hop Songs chart. On the Billboard Hot 100, the song charted at number forty-one. The B-side of the single included "Searchin'", which was previously released only for promotional purposes.

Critical reception
Jose F. Promis from AllMusic complimented "I'm Not Over You" as "fun, jazzy, finger-snapping R&B". Larry Flick from Billboard felt that the song "hangs on a similar [to "I'm in the Mood"] funk/hip-hop tip", adding that "she flexes her nicely matured voice to good effect, gingerly weaving in and around the rugged beat and pulsating synth melody." Troy J. Augusto from Cash Box wrote, "Nice follow-up here to Peniston’s last, semi-successful “In the Mood” release will more than likely top that tune chart-wise. CeCe’s powerful, accomplished vocal style and the song’s undeniable groove should go a long way in further establishing Ms. Peniston’s urban/R&B credentials." He concluded, "A star in the making, for sure." 

Dave Sholin from the Gavin Report wrote, "Some artists have a way with setting just the right mood. That seems to be a gift that CeCe's been blessed with, and she has no problem putting this song through its proper paces." Another editor, Annette M. Lai, described it as "hip-hop and jazz-flavored", naming it one of the "outstanding tracks" of Thought 'Ya Knew. Ralph Tee from Music Weeks RM Dance Update concluded, "With all its infectious hooks", this track "is the stand-out cut" of the album. Mike Joyce from The Washington Post felt that "I'm Not Over You" "reveals her soulfulness."    

Awards and nominations
ASCAP Award

Credits and personnel
 CeCe Peniston – lead/back vocal, executive producer
 Steve Hurley – writer, mix, remix, arranger, engineer
 Jamie Principle – writer
 Marc Williams  – writer (rapping), remix, additional producer
 Jere McAllister  – remix, additional producer
 Donald Paul Mattern – remix, additional producer
 Damon Jones – remix, executive producer
 Rory Bennett – remix
 Sharon Pass – back vocal
 Chantay Savage – back vocal
 Tommye Miller – back vocal
 Aries I – rapping
 Frederick Jorio  – engineer, programming
 Scott Ahaus – engineer
 Steve Weeden – engineer

 Raven Symone – engineer
 David Collins – mastering
 Darryl Dean Dobson – mix
 Manny Lehman – executive producer
 River North Studios, Chicago, Illinois – studio, mix
 Westlake Audio, Los Angeles, California – mix
 The Skool, Chicago, Illinois – mix
 A&M Mastering Studios, L.A. – mastering
 Last Song Inc.(ASCAP) – publisher
 Third Coast Music – admin

Additional credits
 "Searchin'" 

Track listings and formats

 CD3, JP, #PODM-1037 "I'm Not Over You" (LP Version) - 4:18
 "I'm Not Over You" (Silk's Over House 12" Mix) - 6:35

 MCD, US, #31458 0575 2 "I'm Not Over You" (Old Skool 12" Mix) - 7:04
 "I'm Not Over You" (Silk's Over House 12'' Mix) - 6:35
 "I'm Not Over You" (LP Version) - 4:18
 "Searchin'" (Silk's Fusion Mix) - 7:13

 MCS, US, #31458 0574 4 "I'm Not Over You" (LP Version) - 4:18
 "I'm Not Over You" (Old Skool 7'' Mix) - 3:54
 "I'm Not Over You" (Silk's Over House 12'' Mix) - 6:35
 "I'm Not Over You" (Flava Mix) - 4:12

 MCD, US, Promo, #31458 8277 2 "I'm Not Over You" (LP Version) - 4:18
 "I'm Not Over You" (Flava Mix) - 4:12
 "I'm Not Over You" (Old Skool 7'' Mix) - 3:54
 "I'm Not Over You" (Hip Hop Mix with Rap) - 4:34
 "I'm Not Over You" (Silk's Over House Radio Mix) - 4:37

 12", US, #31458 0575 1 "I'm Not Over You" (Silk's Over House 12'' Mix) - 6:35
 "I'm Not Over You" (Deep Tribal Mix) - 5:34
 "I'm Not Over You" (Old Skool 12" Mix) - 7:04
 "I'm Not Over You" (Junior's Factory Mix) - 9:30
 "I'm Not Over You" (Jamie's Under the Swing Mix) - 6:56
 "I'm Not Over You" (LP Version) - 4:18

 12", US, Promo, Double, #31458 8277 1'
 "I'm Not Over You" (Silk's Over House 12'' Mix) - 6:35
 "I'm Not Over You" (Over House Instrumental) - 6:34
 "I'm Not Over You" (LP Version) - 4:18
 "I'm Not Over You" (Junior's Factory Mix) - 9:30
 "I'm Not Over You" (Jamie's Under the Swing Mix) - 6:56
 "I'm Not Over You" (Old Skool 12" Mix) - 7:04
 "I'm Not Over You" (Urban Swing Mix without Rap) - 3:56
 "I'm Not Over You" (Hip Hop Mix with Rap) - 4:34
 "I'm Not Over You" (Deep Tribal Mix) - 5:34
 "I'm Not Over You" (Junior's Factory Instrumental) - 9:16
 "I'm Not Over You" (Over Beats Mix) - 2:57

Charts

Weekly charts

Year-end charts

References

General

 Specific

External links
 

1997 singles
CeCe Peniston songs
Songs written by Steve "Silk" Hurley
1997 songs
Songs written by Jamie Principle
A&M Records singles
Songs written by M-Doc